Tyler Christopher (born Tyler Christopher Baker; November 11, 1972) is an American actor. He is best known for his roles as Nikolas Cassadine (1996–1999, 2003–2011, 2013–2016) and Connor Bishop (2004–2005) on the ABC soap opera General Hospital. In August 2017, it was announced that Christopher would be joining the cast of the NBC soap opera Days of Our Lives as the son of long-time villains Stefano DiMera and Vivian Alamain. His tenure on the show began December 29, 2017. Christopher left the series on March 20, 2019; his role was recast with Brandon Barash.

Early life
Christopher was born in Joliet, Illinois to Jim and Jimi-Ann Baker and grew up in Delaware, Ohio, the youngest of four children. While the family believed that they had Native American heritage, a DNA test taken by his father and sister showed no Native American ancestry.

He attended Ohio Wesleyan University for two years and then moved to Los Angeles.

Career
In 1993, Christopher — then credited as Tyler Baker — auditioned for the role of Stone Cates for the soap opera General Hospital; the role was later cast with actor Michael Sutton. In April 1996, Christopher was cast in the role of Nikolas Cassadine for the serial; he signed a three-year deal and filmed his first scenes in late June 1996. In June 1999, it was announced that Christopher opted not to renew his deal with the soap. Following his daytime departure, Christopher made appearances in primetime. In March 2003, it was announced that Christopher would return to General Hospital; then-executive producer Jill Farren Phelps described Christopher's return as an opportunity the serial could not pass up.

In March 2011, Soap Opera Digest reported on their social media accounts that Christopher had been let go from the serial, due to Christopher's casting on ABC Family's The Lying Game, produced by former General Hospital head writer Charles Pratt Jr. Christopher verified the reports of his firing to ABC Soaps In Depth; he explained that he had been released from his deal on Friday March 18, 2011, and the character of Nikolas was to be written out. Christopher's deal was set to expire in June and the date would have marked the beginning of the last 13 week-cycle period in his deal—at which time the network would notify the actor of their decision to offer another deal. While Christopher had previously admitted he was unsure about renewing his deal, he was open to working both shows and thought it was a likely possibility considering they were both under ABC. Christopher last appeared on June 30, 2011; he later returned for a three-day guest appearance from July 27 to July 30, 2011.

In March 2013, Christopher returned in a recurring capacity at General Hospital, while continuing to appear on The Lying Game. In June 2013, it was announced that Christopher had signed a deal to appear on a regular basis on General Hospital. The following month, it was announced that The Lying Game had been canceled after two seasons. In May 2016, actor Nick Stabile was temporarily cast in the role of Nikolas, with Christopher being unavailable, for an undisclosed amount of time. In September 2016, Soap Opera Digest reported that negotiations between Christopher and the serial had fallen apart, and that he would not be reprising his portrayal of Nikolas. Christopher made his last appearance on June 16, 2016.

In August 2017, it was announced that Christopher had joined the cast of Days of Our Lives in a newly created role. Christopher previously made a one-episode guest appearance on the soap in 2001. He made his first appearance as Stefan DiMera on December 29, 2017. His last episode was March 20, 2019.

Personal life
Christopher was married to Eva Longoria from 2002 to 2004. He was previously engaged to General Hospital co-star Vanessa Marcil and dated Natalia Livingston. He and auto racing reporter Brienne Pedigo publicly announced their engagement in October 2006; Christopher and Pedigo married September 27, 2008. The couple had their first child, a son, Greyson James, on October 3, 2009. In October 2014, it was announced that Christopher and his wife were expecting their second child, due in May 2015. On May 3, 2015, Christopher announced on his official Twitter feed that Brienne Pedigo had given birth to a baby girl named Boheme. Brienne Pedigo filed for divorce in February 2019.

Legal issues
On November 11, 2019, Christopher was arrested and charged with public intoxication in Martinsville, Morgan County, Indiana. He pled guilty and paid a small fine.

Filmography

Awards and nominations

References

External links

Tyler Christopher at the TV.com
68 Cent Crew Theater site

1972 births
Living people
American male soap opera actors
Daytime Emmy Award winners
Daytime Emmy Award for Outstanding Lead Actor in a Drama Series winners
Male actors from Illinois
Actors from Joliet, Illinois
People from Delaware, Ohio